Sebastian Sailer (12 February 1714 in Weißenhorn – 7 March 1777 in Obermarchtal), born Johann Valentin Sailer, was a German Premonstratensian Baroque preacher and writer. He is especially known for his comedies written in Swabian German.

Writings

Works written in dialect 
Sailer's Swabian dialect is that of his hometown Weißenhorn (in what is now Bavarian Swabia) with influences by the hefty rural dialect of his Upper Swabian parishes.

Schöpfung der ersten Menschen, der Sündenfall und dessen Strafe (Creation of the First Men, the Fall of Mankind and its Punishment, commonly referred to as Die Schwäbische Schöpfung, i. e. The Swabian Creation), musical comedy, 1743
Der Fall Luzifers (The Fall of Lucifer), musical comedy, after 1738
Die sieben Schwaben, oder: Die Hasenjagd (The Seven Swabians, or The Hunting of the Hare), comedy, c. 1756
Beste Gesinnungen Schwäbischer Herzen (Best Dispositions of Swabian Hearts), cantata, 1770
Die Schultheißenwahl zu Limmelsdorf (The Mayoral Election at Limmelsdorf), play, 1770
Die schwäbischen heiligen drei Könige (The Swabian Three Magi), comedy, 1771
Bauernhochzeit (Peasant Wedding), ballad
Peter als Gott Vater (Peter as God the Father), ballad
various occasional musical comedies containing Latin, standard German and dialect passages

Theological and historical works 
Vier Sendschreiben wider H. P. Aug. Dornblüth (Four Epistles against H. P. Aug. Dornblüth), published under the pseudonym Benastasii Liares, 1755-1756
Das Marianische Orakel (The Marian Oracle), meditations, 1763
Kempensis Marianus, Latin meditations, 1764
Geistliche Reden (Theological Speeches), three volumes, 1766-1770
Das jubilierende Marchtall (Jubilant Marchtal), a history of the monastery of Obermarchtal, 1771
Geistliche Schaubühne („Spiritual Playhouse“), texts for oratorios, 1774

References 
Hans Albrecht Oehler: Sebastian Sailer. 1714-1777. Chorherr, Dorfpfarrer, Dichter. Marbacher Magazin, Vol. 76. Deutsche Schillergesellschaft, Marbach am Neckar 1996,

External links 
Sailer Museum in Dieterskirch

1714 births
1777 deaths
People from Neu-Ulm (district)
Premonstratensians
German male non-fiction writers
18th-century German Roman Catholic priests
18th-century German Catholic theologians
Swabian-language writers